The Sweet Gum Stable, also known as Farmer's Feed and Supply, was located at the southeast corner of Main and W. Seventh Street in New Albany, Indiana.  The property was a stop of the Underground Railroad, ten blocks west of another stop, the Town Clock Church, and a mere block away from the River Jordan for fugitive slaves, the Ohio River.  The stable was built in 1877, and consisted of a balloon frame stable with an attached small brick and frame dwelling constructed about 1836. A feed store was added to the building in 1886. The structured measured 60 feet by 120 feet and encompassed the entire lot.

The house on the property was built by steamboat captain Thomas Riddle.  After the American Civil War, Riddle's heirs sold most of the property to William Robison and James Payton.  From them Frank Howard bought the property, and built the Sweet Gum Stable on the grounds of the original livery stable.

In early 1996, the stable was listed on the National Register of Historic Places.  In late 1998, it was sold at auction, and on May 22, 1999, was torn down.  A feed store is in its place.  The stable was removed from the National Register in December 2011.

References

External links
 The Underground Railroad in Floyd County, Indiana by Pamela R. Peters

Buildings and structures in New Albany, Indiana
Underground Railroad in Indiana
Former National Register of Historic Places in Indiana
Agricultural buildings and structures on the National Register of Historic Places in Indiana
National Register of Historic Places in Floyd County, Indiana
Buildings and structures completed in 1836
Demolished buildings and structures in Indiana
Buildings and structures demolished in 1999